Individual Computers is a German computer hardware company specializing in retrocomputing accessories for the Commodore 64, Amiga, and PC platforms. Individual Computers produced the C-One reconfigurable computer in 2003. The company is owned and run by Jens Schönfeld.

Products
Catweasel – Universal format floppy disk drive controller card
Retro Replay – Improved version of the C64 Action Replay cartridge
Clone-A – Amiga in FPGA website (coming soon?)
 See the PDF extract of Total Amiga Magazine issue 25
MMC64 – MMC and SD Card reader cartridge
MMC Replay – MMC64 and Retro Replay combined in one cartridge, with some improvements
Micromys – An adapter that allows connecting PS/2 compatible mice (including wheel-support) to C64 and Amiga joystick-ports (and all other computers that share the same pin-configuration).
Amiga clock port compatible addons for MMC64, Retro Replay and MMC Replay:
RR-Net: A C64-compatible Network-Interface. Comes in 2 shapes, the old long RR-Net fits Retro Replay and MMC64 (though partly blocking the latter's passthrough expansionport), the new L-shaped RR-Net2 fits MMC64 and MMC Replay and was built with MMC Replay in mind.
Silver Surfer: Highspeed RS232 Interface for Amiga 1200 and 600 (with adapter). Fits onto Retro Replay, MMC64/Replay compatibility unknown.
mp3@c64: hardware mp3 decoding from SD card. Made for MMC64, Retro Replay and MMC Replay compatibility unknown.
Keyrah – An interface that allows the connection of Commodore keyboards to USB-capable computers
C-One – reconfigurable computer
X-Surf – network card
C64 Reloaded - A 1:1 rebuilt C64 motherboard with less power consumption
Indivision – Flicker fixer for Amiga computers
ACA boards - CPU expansion cards for Amiga computers

References

External links
Individual Computers official website
Individual Computers Product Information Wiki

Home computer hardware companies
Electronics companies of Germany
Commodore 64
Amiga companies